The Global Ocean Sampling Expedition (GOS) is an ocean exploration genome project whose goal is to assess genetic diversity in marine microbial communities and to understand their role in nature's fundamental processes. It was begun as a Sargasso Sea pilot sampling project in August 2003; Craig Venter announced the full expedition on 4 March 2004. The two-year journey, which used Craig Venter's personal yacht, originated in Halifax, Canada, circumnavigated the globe and terminated in the U.S. in January 2006. The expedition sampled water from Halifax, Nova Scotia to the Eastern Tropical Pacific Ocean. During 2007, sampling continued along the west coast of North America.

Data analysis
The GOS datasets were submitted to both NCBI and Community Cyberinfrastructure for Advanced Marine Microbial Ecology Research and Analysis (CAMERA), a new online resource for marine metagenomics funded by the Gordon and Betty Moore Foundation, developed by JCVI and hosted by UC San Diego's Division of the California Institute for Telecommunications and Information Technology (Calit2). CAMERA's toolset was developed by JCVI, and reflects the tools used in the initial publication of the GOS datasets.

Funding
The Sorcerer II effort has been funded by:
 the Gordon and Betty Moore Foundation (sequencing and analysis)
 the United States Department of Energy, Office of Science (sequencing and analysis)
 The J. Craig Venter Institute (vessel operation)
 Moore Foundation seven-year, $24.5 million, grant (CAMERA)

Vessel

Sorcerer II, a 95-foot sloop, completed a 2-year scientific expedition circumnavigating the globe in mid latitudes collecting samples of microbes in seawater for genetic sequencing and cataloguing. She was designed to be not just a world cruising yacht, but one that would be capable of handling the extremes in latitudes, from equatorial heat and humidity to latitudes between 60 and 70 degrees. SORCERER II's construction is light for performance, but very strong, with her kevlar and E glass laminates, epoxy bonding and carefully chosen core materials.

The vessel was designed by German Frers and carries  of water.

Publications

The following list is of the official publications of the project and the J. Craig Venter Institute.

See also
 Landform
 Microorganisms
 Metagenomics

Notes

External links

Official blog of the 2009–10 leg
A large picture of Venter on the stern of the Sorcerer II
 GOS data from CAMERA

Genome projects
2003 in science
Oceanographic expeditions